The South Plainfield Public Schools is a comprehensive community public school district, for South Plainfield, in Middlesex County, New Jersey, United States, that serves students in pre-kindergarten through twelfth grade.

As of the 2020–21 school year, the district, comprised of seven schools, had an enrollment of 3,400 students and 304.0 classroom teachers (on an FTE basis), for a student–teacher ratio of 11.2:1.

The district is classified by the New Jersey Department of Education as being in District Factor Group "FG", the fourth-highest of eight groupings. District Factor Groups organize districts statewide to allow comparison by common socioeconomic characteristics of the local districts. From lowest socioeconomic status to highest, the categories are A, B, CD, DE, FG, GH, I and J.

Schools
The schools in the district (with 2020–21 enrollment data from the National Center for Education Statistics). are:
Elementary schools
Franklin Elementary School with 264 students in grades K-4
Shannon A. Colucci, Principal
John F. Kennedy Elementary School with 268 students in grades PreK-4
Kevin Hajduk, Principal
John E. Riley Elementary School with 333 students in grades PreK-4
Rosaura Valarezo, Interim Principal
Roosevelt Elementary School with 448 students in grades PreK-4
Dr. Robert Goman, Principal
Grant School with 444 students in grades 5-6
Patrick Sarullo, Principal
Middle school
South Plainfield Middle School with 529 students in grades 7-8
Leo Whalen, Principal
High school
South Plainfield High School with 1,076 students in grades 9-12
John Foscolo, Principal

Administration
Core members of the district's administration are:
Dr. Noreen Tansey Lishak, Superintendent of Schools
Alex Benanti, Board Secretary / Business Administrator

Board of education
The district's board of education, comprised of nine members, sets policy and oversees the fiscal and educational operation of the district through its administration. As a Type II school district, the board's trustees are elected directly by voters to serve three-year terms of office on a staggered basis, with three seats up for election each year held (since 2012) as part of the November general election. The board appoints a superintendent to oversee the district's day-to-day operations and a business administrator to supervise the business functions of the district.

References

External links
Official site
 
School Data for the South Plainfield Public Schools, National Center for Education Statistics

South Plainfield, New Jersey
New Jersey District Factor Group FG
School districts in Middlesex County, New Jersey